NMPA may refer to:

 National Medical Products Administration, Chinese pharmaceutical and medical regulatory body
 National Music Publishers' Association, American music publishing industry trade association